Pitch People (1999 film) is a 1999 American documentary film about advertising "pitchmen" and "pitch women". Written and directed by Stanley Jacobs, the film includes interviews with many of the sales industry's pitch people including Arnold Morris, Sandy Mason, Lester Morris, Wally Nash, Ed McMahon and Ron Popeil.

Pitch People screened at several festivals in 2000, including the Rhode Island International Film Festival, Mill Valley Film Festival (No. 23), Boston Film Festival and Palm Beach Film International Festival.

See also
 Salesman (1969 film)
PitchMen (television reality series)

External links and Reviews

https://www.latimes.com/archives/la-xpm-2001-jun-14-ca-10202-story.html
https://www.austinchronicle.com/events/film/2001-05-18/pitch-people/

References

1999 films
Infomercials
Documentary films about business
American documentary films
1999 documentary films
1990s American films